This was the first edition of the tournament.

Lukáš Rosol eventually won the title, defeating Jiří Veselý in the final, 3–6, 6–4, 6–4.

Seeds

  Lukáš Rosol (champion)
  Jiří Veselý (final)
  Aleksandr Nedovyesov (first round)
  Peter Polansky (first round)
  Jan Hájek (withdrew)
  Adrián Menéndez-Maceiras (second round)
  Matteo Viola (second round)
  Roberto Carballés Baena (first round)

Draw

Finals

Top half

Bottom half

References
 Main Draw
 Qualifying Draw

Prague Open - Singles
2014 - Singles